Giorgi Chankotadze (born 4 October 1977) is a retired Georgian professional football player.

External links

1977 births
Living people
Footballers from Georgia (country)
Georgia (country) international footballers
Association football defenders